Shirley Gale Cross (August 27, 1915, Oklahoma – July 14, 2008, East Sandwich, Massachusetts) was an American botanist, botanical illustrator, and conservationist.

Biography
Shirley Gale grew up in Gloucester and Marblehead and graduated from Massachusetts State College (renamed in 1947 the University of Massachusetts Amherst). At Radcliffe College, she received her Ph.D. in 1939 with M. L. Fernald as her thesis supervisor.

In 1941, she married Chester "Chet" E. Cross (1913–1988), her classmate who received a Ph.D. in paleobotany from Harvard. The couple moved to the Spring Hill Historic District of Sandwich, Massachusetts, where they owned and cultivated three cranberry bogs to supply cranberries for the fresh fruit market. They continued growing cranberries until shortly before Chet Cross's death.
She and Gordon Dillon drew the illustrations for Edith Scamman's 1947 book Ferns and Fern Allies of New Hampshire. Shirley Gale Cross drew the Rhynchospora illustrations and many of the fern illustrations for the 8th edition of Gray's Manual of Botany.

Cross was a founding member of the Thornton W. Burgess Society and conceived, designed, cultivated, and organized the Society's wildflower garden named in her honor.

Upon her death, she was survived by three sons, six grandchildren, and one great-grandchild.

References

1915 births
2008 deaths
20th-century American botanists
21st-century American botanists
University of Massachusetts Amherst alumni
Radcliffe College alumni
Women botanists
20th-century American women scientists
21st-century American women scientists
American women botanists
American conservationists
Botanical illustrators